Pedduru is a village in Kadapa district of the Indian state of Andhra Pradesh. It is located in Chitvel mandal.

References

Villages in Kadapa district